Mabel Veronica Hatch Batten (1856–1916) was a well-known amateur singer of lieder.

Early life
She was born Mabel Hatch in a well-connected family.

She studied in Dresden and Bruges, harmony and composition.

Career

She was a leading "patroness of music and the arts, mezzo-soprano and composer" of drawing-room songs. One of her best compositions was the setting of "The Queen's Last Ride" by the poem of Ella Wheeler Wilcox. She was an accomplished singer, pianist and guitar player.

Personal life

In 1874 she married George Batten, secretary to the Viceroy of India. They had one daughter, the painter and film maker Lady Cara Harris. 

In the 1880s she had a relationship with Wilfred Scawen Blunt. 

She was friends with composer Adela Maddison who, in 1893, dedicated her "Deux Melodies" to her. She was also friends with composer Ethel Smyth.

From 1906 she was friends with Toupie Lowther and her brother Claude Lowther. 

On August 22, 1907, at Bad Homburg, a spa in Germany, Mabel Batten met Radclyffe Hall. Batten was 51 years old and Hall was 27. In 1913 Batten and Hall visited the Lowthers at Claude's Herstmonceux Castle.When Batten was a widow, she went to live with Hall in Cadogan Square. Batten, nicknamed Ladye, gave the name John to Hall, which Hall used for the rest of her life.

In 1915 Hall met Batten's cousin Una Troubridge (1887–1963). When Batten died the following year, Troubridge took care of a defeated Hall and in 1917 they went to live together.

Batten is buried in a vault in the Circle of Lebanon on the western side of Highgate Cemetery in London, and Hall chose to be buried at the entrance of the crypt.

Legacy
Mabel Batten's portraits were taken by John Singer Sargent and Edward John Poynter.

References

1856 births
1916 deaths
Burials at Highgate Cemetery